St Colmac Manse (also known as Cnoc an Raer) is an historic building in St Colmac on the Isle of Bute, Scotland. Both properties are believed to have been built by John Paterson, a "very able builder and skilled mason" of Largs.

It is two storeys, with a rear extension added in the 20th century. Also at the rear there are two stone outbuildings under slate roofs.

Interior
The interior includes a solid-fuel Rayburn range in the kitchen and a cantilever staircase leading up to the first floor. The ground floor has an entrance vestibule, a living room, dining room, music room, kitchen, laundry room and pantry, while on the first floor there is a bathroom (with original Victorian clawfoot bath), the master bedroom with dressing room/bedroom, plus three further bedrooms.

Exterior
In the back garden there are bedded stone footings of a rectangular building and yard wall. These are the remains of the former Edinmore farm, in records from 1576. The farm belonged to the Estate of Wester Kames. Occupation of the farm ended shortly before the manse's construction.

References

1835 establishments in Scotland
Residential buildings completed in 1835
Clergy houses in Scotland